Tennis at the 2005 Islamic Solidarity Games was held at the King Fahd Sporting City, Ta'if from April 12 to April 19, 2005.

Medalists

Medal table

References
  kooora.com

2005 Islamic Solidarity Games
Islamic Solidarity Games
2005
2005 Islamic Solidarity Games